There have been three baronetcies created for persons with the surname Sanderson, two in the Baronetage of Great Britain and one in the Baronetage of the United Kingdom. One creation is extant as of 2007.

The Sanderson Baronetcy, of Greenwich in the County of Kent, was created in the Baronetage of Great Britain on 19 July 1720 for William Sanderson. The title became extinct on the death of the third Baronet in 1760.

The Sanderson Baronetcy, of the City of London, was created in the Baronetage of Great Britain on 6 December 1794 for James Sanderson. He represented Malmesbury and Hastings in the House of Commons. The title became extinct on his death in 1798.

The Sanderson Baronetcy, of Malling Deanery in South Malling in the County of Sussex, was created in the Baronetage of the United Kingdom on 26 June 1920 for the businessman, Conservative politician and public servant Frank Sanderson.

Sanderson baronets, of Greenwich (1720)
Sir William Sanderson, 1st Baronet (died 1727)
Sir William Sanderson, 2nd Baronet (1692–1754)
Sir William Sanderson, 3rd Baronet (1746–1760)

Sanderson baronets, of the City of London (1794)
Sir James Sanderson, 1st Baronet (1741–1798)

Sanderson baronets, of Malling Deanery (1920)
Sir Frank Bernard Sanderson, 1st Baronet (1880–1965)
Sir (Frank Philip) Bryan Sanderson, 2nd Baronet (1910–1992)
Sir Frank Linton Sanderson, 3rd Baronet, OBE (born 1933)

References

External links
www.burkespeerage.com
Kidd, Charles, Williamson, David (editors). Debrett's Peerage and Baronetage (1990 edition). New York: St Martin's Press, 1990, 

Baronetcies in the Baronetage of the United Kingdom
Extinct baronetcies in the Baronetage of Great Britain